Jerome Barnes is an American politician serving as a member of the Missouri House of Representatives from the 28th district. Elected in 2016, he assumed office in January 2017.

Early life and education 
Barnes was born in Mississippi. He attended Longview Community College (now Metropolitan Community College) in the Kansas City metropolitan area.

Career 
Prior to his career in politics, Barnes served in the United States Army and worked for the United States Postal Service. In 2016, Barnes defeated Republican nominee Bill Van Buskirk in the November general election for 28th district in the Missouri House of Representatives. He defeated Libertarian nominee Jeremy Utterback in 2018 and ran unopposed in 2020.

Electoral History

Personal life 
Barnes and his wife, Donna, have three children. They live in Raytown, Missouri.

References 

Living people
Democratic Party members of the Missouri House of Representatives
People from Raytown, Missouri
21st-century American politicians
Year of birth missing (living people)